Advanced meat recovery (AMR) is a slaughterhouse deboning process by which the last traces of skeletal muscle meat are removed from animal bones after the primal cuts have been carved off manually.

The machinery used in this process separates meat from bone by scraping, shaving, or pressing the meat from the bone without breaking or grinding the bone. Products produced by advanced meat recovery machinery can be labeled using terms associated with hand-deboned product (i.e., "beef", "pork", "beef trimmings", etc.). AMR meat typically is used as an ingredient in products requiring further processing, such as hot dogs.

This meat is comparable in appearance, texture, and composition to meat trimmings and similar meat products derived by hand.

USDA regulations for procurement of frozen fresh ground beef products state that "Beef that is mechanically separated from bone with automatic deboning systems, advanced lean (meat) recovery (AMR) systems or powered knives, will not be allowed".

Regulation in the United States
In the United States, USDA regulations stipulate that AMR machinery cannot grind, crush, or pulverize bones to remove edible meat tissue, and bones must emerge intact. The meat produced in this manner can contain no more than 150(±30) milligrams of calcium per 100 grams product, as calcium in such high concentrations in the product would be indicative of bone being mixed with the meat. Products that exceed the calcium content limit must instead be labeled "mechanically separated beef or pork" in the ingredients statement.

In 1994, the Food Safety and Inspection Service (FSIS) issued a rule allowing such meat to be labeled as meat for human consumption, providing that the bones from which it was removed were still intact after processing. In 1997, following tests indicating that central nervous system (CNS) tissue was showing up in mechanically removed meat, FSIS issued a directive to its inspectors instructing them to ensure that spinal cord tissue was removed from bones before the AMR process. Following the identification of a BSE-infected U.S. dairy cow in December 2003, FSIS issued new regulations expanding the definition of prohibited CNS tissue to include additional cattle parts. Furthermore, all AMR-processed product from cattle more than 30 months old now is prohibited from being used for food, and such product from younger cattle and from other
livestock species also is prohibited if it contains CNS material.

The USDA's AMR guidelines restrict the processing of the parts of cattle that may contain central nervous tissue from AMR systems in cattle over 30 months of age. However, non-CNS tissue meat can be processed and is considered meat, as are the muscle cuts. Although some sources claim AMR systems use ammonia (or anhydrous ammonia, ammonia hydroxide, etc.) to treat the meat, this appears to be due to confusion between AMR and the production of lean finely textured beef (LFTB, commonly referred to as pink slime). LFTB is in fact treated with ammonia, and so is substantially more restricted than most AMR products.

Regulation in Europe
In 2012, the European Commission changed the classification of desinewed meat (DSM) so that it could no longer be called 'meat' but must be included in the category of mechanically recovered meat (MRM). The downgrade of DSM took effect in the UK in May 2012. Unlike other types of MRM, which have the appearance of a paste, DSM resembled minced meat and was previously sold in the UK as 'meat'.

See also
 Mechanically separated meat (MSM)
 Pink slime
 Specified risk material (SRM)

References

External links
 United States Department of Agriculture Fact Sheet on Advanced Meat Recovery

Meat industry
Intensive farming